A performance, in performing arts, is generally an event in which a performer or group of performers behave in a particular way for another group of people.

Performance may also refer to:

Arts and media
Performance art, art work presented within a fine art context
Performing arts, in which artists use their voices or bodies for artistic expression

Film and television
 Performance (film), a 1970 film starring James Fox and Mick Jagger
 Performance (TV series), British television series
 A Late Quartet, a 2012 film released in Australia under the name Performance
 Performance Channel, a former UK cable and satellite channel

Music
 Performance (soundtrack), a soundtrack album from the 1970 film, or the title song by Bernie Krause and Merry Clayton
 Performance (Eloy album), 1983
 Performance (Marti Webb album), 1989
 Performance (Spacemen 3 album), 1988
 Performance (White Denim album) or the title song, 2018
 The Performance, an album by Shirley Bassey, 2009
 Performance (EP), by Kylie Minogue, 2010
 Rising (Donovan album), 1990; re-released as Performance, 1997
 "Performance", a song by Priestess from Hello Master, 2005
 "Performance", a song by the xx from I See You, 2017
 "Performance", a concert tour in 1991 by the English duo The Pet Shop Boys

Other media
 Performance!, a 2000 book of photographs by Clive Barda

Business processes 
 Job performance, a measure of the effectiveness of an employee
 Performance engineering
 Performance improvement
 Performance management
 Performance measurement

Computing
 Computer performance
 Performance analysis
 Performance tuning
 Software performance testing
 Network performance

Humanities and social sciences
 Linguistic performance, the act of producing an utterance
 The performative turn, a paradigmatic shift in the humanities and social sciences
 Performative text, in philosophy of language
 Performance of a contract, in law
 A ritual in a religious or occult setting

Other uses
 Performance (textiles), capacity of textiles to withstand certain conditions
 The execution of an experiment in science
 Aircraft performance, including landing performance

See also
 Performance testing (disambiguation)